Rambhu Yadav Rautahat Nepal 

Village Development Committee in Rautahat District in the Narayani Zone of south-eastern Nepal. At the time of the 1991 Nepal census it had a population of 3132 people living in 717 individual households.

Pachrukhi has a Large Pond where a Shiva Mandir is located. There are more than 2-6 Durga Temples .

References

Populated places in Rautahat District